The Wiltshire FA Senior Cup is the county cup in Wiltshire and has seniority over the Wiltshire Premier Shield according to the Wiltshire County FA Handbook. It is administered by the Wiltshire Football Association.

According to the current rules of the competition, it is open to all clubs whose first affiliation is with the Wiltshire County FA and who play at levels 5, 6 or 7 below the top four tiers of the English football league system. Clubs can be exempt upon payment of a fee. The most successful side is Devizes Town with 14 titles.

Cup winners

List of Finals

19th century

20th century (1900-1919)

20th century (Inter-war years)

20th century (1945-1970)

20th century (1970-2000)

21st century

Recent Competitions

2008–09

First round

Second Round

Quarter Finals

Semi-Finals

Final

2009–10

First round

Second Round

Quarter Finals

Semi-Finals

Final

2010–11

First round

Second Round

Quarter Finals

Semi-Finals

Final

2011–12

First round

Second Round

Quarter Finals

Semi-Finals

Final

2012–13

First round

Second Round

Quarter Finals

Semi-Finals

Final

2013–14

First round

Second Round

Quarter Finals

Semi-final

Final

2014-15

First round

Second Round

Quarter Finals

Semi-Finals

Final

2015-16

First round

Second Round

Quarter Finals

Semi-finals

Final

2016-17

First round

Second Round

Quarter-finals

Semi-finals

Final

2017-18

First round

Second Round

Quarter-finals

Semi-finals

Final

2018-19

First Round

Second Round

Quarter-finals

Semi-finals

Final

2019-20

The following teams received a first round bye.

Bemerton Heath Harlequins 
Calne Town
Corsham Town 
Cricklade Town 

Downton 
Laverstock & Ford 
Ludgershall Sports FC 
Malmesbury Victoria 

New College Swindon  
Stratton Juniors 
Trowbridge Town 
Warminster Town 
Wroughton 

First round

Second round

Quarter-finals

Semi-finals

Final

COMPETITION SUSPENDED due to the COVID-19 pandemic. The final was never played even when restrictions were partially lifted.

2020-21
First round

Second round

The first and second round draw was made as above, but the competition was suspended and then cancelled due to imposition of restrictions due to the ongoing COVID-19 pandemic.

2021-22

First round

Quarter finals

Semi finals

Final

2022-23
First Round

Amesbury Town received a first round bye

Quarter-finals

Semi-finals

Final

References

County Cup competitions
Football in Wiltshire